Mozambique competed at the 1996 Summer Olympics in Atlanta, United States.  The nation won its first ever Olympic medal at these Games.

Medalists

Bronze
 Maria de Lurdes Mutola — Athletics, Women's 800 metres

Athletics

Women
Track and road events

Boxing

Men

Swimming

Men

References
Official Olympic Reports
International Olympic Committee results database

Nations at the 1996 Summer Olympics
1996
Oly